George Aaron Barton (12 November 1859 – 28 June 1942) was a Canadian author, Episcopal clergyman, and professor of Semitic languages and the history of religion.

Biography
Barton was born on 12 November 1859 in East Farnham, Canada East, Canada. After attending Oakwood Seminary in Union Springs, New York. Barton became a minister in the Religious Society of Friends and continued his education at Haverford College, completing a MA in 1885. He taught in Rhode Island from 1884 to 1889, then earned a PhD at Harvard and became a professor of Semitic languages at Bryn Mawr College in 1891.

In 1922 Barton moved to the University of Pennsylvania, where he was professor of Semitic languages and the history of religion. He retired in 1931 and held the title of professor emeritus until his death. He specialized in many subjects, particularly in Semitic languages. His many publications cover a wide range of topics in areas such as biblical studies, religion, and linguistics along with translations of Sumerian cuneiform tablets. He was fascinated by bible archeology and wrote a text book on the subject, published in 1916, along with other publications on similar subjects.

Barton specialized in translations of Sumerian & Akkadian tablets, seals and cylinders. He notably translated a set of Sumerian tablets recovered in 1896–1898 by the University of Pennsylvania's excavation at Nippur initially labelled as "Miscellaneous Babylonian Inscriptions", including creation myths known as the Barton Cylinder and the Debate between sheep and grain. These were later revised by Samuel Noah Kramer.

Barton died in Weston, Massachusetts, on 28 June 1942.

Positions, awards and accolades
 1891–1922 Professor of Semitic languages, Bryn Mawr College.
 1922–1931 Professor of Semitic languages and the history of religion, University of Pennsylvania.
 1932–1942 Professor Emeritus, University of Pennsylvania
 1921–1934 Director of the American School of Oriental Research, Baghdad.

Books
 Barton, G.A., 1894, Native Israelitish Deities, Oriental Club of Philadelphia.
 Barton, G.A., 1902, A Sketch of Semitic Origins: Social and Religious, The Macmillan Company.
 Barton, G.A., 1904, A Year's Wandering in Bible Lands, Ferris & Leach.
 Barton, G.A., 1905–14, The Haverford Library Collection of Cuneiform Tablets, or Documents from the Temple Archives of Telloh. Parts 1–3. New Haven.
 Barton, G.A., 1906, Traces of the Diatessaron of Tatian in Harclean Syriac Lectionaries, s.n.
 Barton, G.A., 1908, A Critical and Exegetical Commentary on the Book of Ecclesiastes, T & T Clark Ltd, Edinburgh.
 Barton, G.A., 1909, Haverford Library Collection of Cuneiform Tablets or Documents from the Temple Archives of Telloh, Volumes 1-3, The John C. Winston Company.
 Barton, G.A., 1911, Commentary on the Book of Job, The Macmillan Company.
 Barton, G.A., 1912, The Heart of the Christian Message, The Macmillan Company.
 Barton, G.A., 1913, The Origin and Development of Babylonian Writing, J. C. Hinrichs.
 Barton, G.A., 1915, Sumerian Business and Administrative Documents from the Earliest Times to the Dynasty of Agade, Harvard University Museum.
 Barton, G.A., 1916, Archæology and the Bible, American Sunday School Union. Re-printed  BiblioBazaar (26 November 2009) 
 Barton, G.A., 1917, New Babylonian Material Concerning Creation and Paradise, The University of Chicago Press.
 Barton, G.A., 1918, The Religion of Ancient Israel, The Macmillan Company.
 Barton, G.A., 1918, Miscellaneous Babylonian Inscriptions, Volume 1, Yale University Press.
 Barton, G.A., 1919, The Religions of the World, The University of Chicago Press.
 Barton, G.A., 1922, Jesus of Nazareth: A Biography, The Macmillan Company.
 Barton, G.A., 1926, The Annual of the American Schools of Oriental Research, American Schools of Oriental Research.
 Barton, G.A., 1928, Studies in New Testament Christianity, University of Pennsylvania Press.
 Barton, G.A., 1928, Hittite Studies, Volumes 1-2, P. Geuthner.
 Barton, G.A., 1929, The Royal Inscriptions of Sumer and Akkad, Yale University press.
 Barton, G.A., 1930, A History of the Hebrew People from the Earliest Times to the Year 70 A.D.: Largely in the Language of Bible, The Century co.
 Barton, G.A., 1932, A Hittite Chrestomathy with Vocabulary, P. Geuthner.
 Barton, G.A., 1934, Christ and Evolution: A Study of the Doctrine of Redemption in the Light of Modern Knowledge, University of Pennsylvania Press.
 Barton, G.A., 1934, Semitic and Hamitic Origins: Social and Religious, University of Pennsylvania Press.
 Barton, G.A., 1936, The Apostolic Age and the New Testament, University of Pennsylvania Press.

See also
Christian O'Brien

References

External links
 
 
 

1859 births
1942 deaths
19th-century Canadian male writers
19th-century Canadian non-fiction writers
19th-century Christian biblical scholars
19th-century Quakers
20th-century Canadian Anglican priests
20th-century Canadian male writers
20th-century Canadian non-fiction writers
20th-century Christian biblical scholars
20th-century Quakers
Anglican biblical scholars
Anglophone Quebec people
Biblical archaeology
Bryn Mawr College faculty
Canadian archaeologists
Canadian biblical scholars
Canadian Christian religious leaders
Canadian historians of religion
Canadian male non-fiction writers
Canadian Quakers
Converts to Anglicanism from Quakerism
Former Quakers
Harvard University alumni
Haverford College alumni
Linguists from Canada
New Testament scholars
People from Montérégie
Quaker ministers
Quaker writers
Semiticists
University and college chaplains in America
University of Pennsylvania faculty
Writers from Quebec